Hirotaka Ishikawa (born September 12, 1973, in Osaka Prefecture, Japan) is a Japanese politician who has served as a member of the House of Councillors of Japan since 2010. He represents the Osaka at-large district and is a member of the Komeito party.

References 

Living people
1973 births
Politicians from Osaka Prefecture
21st-century Japanese politicians
Members of the House of Councillors (Japan)
Komeito politicians